The Holle Cropper ( also known as the Amsterdam Balloon Cropper) is a breed of fancy pigeon developed over many years of selective breeding. Holle Croppers, along with other varieties of domesticated pigeons are all descendants from the rock pigeon (Columba livia). This breed was developed in Holland.

See also 

List of pigeon breeds

References

Pigeon breeds
Pigeon breeds originating in the Netherlands